Senator Joseph may refer to:

George W. Joseph (1872–1930), Oregon State Senate
Irving J. Joseph (1881–1943), New York State Senate
Lazarus Joseph (1891–1966), New York State Senate